Ayopaya is a province in the Cochabamba Department, Bolivia. Its capital is Ayopaya (or Independencia).

Geography 
Some of the highest mountains of the province are listed below:

Subdivision 
Ayopaya Province is divided into three municipalities which are further subdivided into cantons.

Cocapata Municipality (formerly Cocapata Canton) was created on February 6, 2009. Its mother municipality is Morochata.

See also 
 Tunari National Park

References 

Provinces of Cochabamba Department